The Aviate Raptor is a South African two-seat ultralight trike that was designed by Manfred Springer and produced by Aviate Products of Booysens. The aircraft was introduced in 1992 and supplied as a kit for amateur construction.

Design and development
It also carries South African government certification. It features a cable-braced hang glider-style high-wing, weight-shift controls, a two-seats-in-tandem open cockpit, tricycle landing gear and a single engine in pusher configuration.

The aircraft is made from steel tubing, with its double-surface Raptor 17 XP wing covered in Dacron sailcloth. Its  span wing incorporates 34 stiffening battens, is supported by a single tube-type kingpost and uses an "A" frame control bar. The basic aircraft offered a standard  Rotax 447 twin cylinder, two stroke, air-cooled, single ignition engine, while the Raptor 912 model came equipped with the  Rotax 912UL four cylinder, four-stroke air- and liquid-cooled, dual ignition engine. The  Rotax 582 was also a factory option. The aircraft was supplied as a kit that requires 20 to 30 hours to assemble.

Factory standard equipment included two bucket seats, side skirts with integral saddle bags and a nose wheel fender. In 2000 the carriage cost US$3500 and the Raptor 17 XP wing cost $4500. The aircraft's carriage was designed so that it would also accept French Cosmos ULM wings. Fifty examples had been delivered by 2000.

Variants
Raptor
Basic model introduced in 1996 with  Rotax 447 or  Rotax 582 engine
Raptor 912
Model introduced in 2000, equipped with the  Rotax 912UL engine and came standard from the factory with many optional extras

Specifications (version)

References

External links
Photo of a Raptor in flight

1990s South African ultralight aircraft
Homebuilt aircraft
Single-engined pusher aircraft
Ultralight trikes